Heongang of Silla (c.861–886) (r. 875–886) was the 49th to rule the Korean kingdom of Silla.

According to the Samguk Sagi, he excelled at civil affairs.  Heongang was the eldest son of King Gyeongmun; his mother was Queen Munui.  He had no legitimate heir, but did leave a son (later King Hyogong) by Lady Uimyeong.

In 879, Heongang was faced with the rebellion of a high official, his Ilgilchan Sin Hong.  In 886, he sought to defuse domestic discontent with a decree of general forgiveness.

Heongang was buried to the northeast of Borisa temple in Gyeongju.

Family
Parents
Father: Gyeongmun of Silla
Grandfather: Kim Gye–myeong (김계명)
Grandmother: Madam Gwanghwa (광화부인)
Mother: Queen Munui of the Kim clan (문의왕후 김씨)
Maternal grandfather: Heonan of Silla (헌안왕)
Maternal grandmother: Unknown
Consort and their respective issue:
Queen Uimyeong (의명부인), of the Kim clan (의명왕후 김씨)
Daughter: Princess Uiseong (의성왕후 김씨)– became the Queen Consort of Sindeok of Silla
Daughter: Princess Gyea (계아태후)– married Kim Hyo-Jong (김효종) and became the Queen Mother of Gyeongsun of Silla, the last King of Silla
Son: Hyogong of Silla– was the 52nd ruler of Silla

See also
List of Korean monarchs
List of Silla people
Unified Silla

References

Silla rulers
886 deaths
9th-century Korean monarchs
Year of birth unknown
Year of birth uncertain